Rodrigo de Silva Mendoza y Sarmiento (Madrid, 1600 – León, 1664), was 2nd Marqués of Alanquer, 2nd Count of Salinas, and Duke-consort of Híjar, through his marriage with the 4th Duchess of Híjar, Isabel Fernández of Híjar. He plotted in 1648 to become King of Aragon and died in prison.

He married in October 1622 with Isabel Fernández of Híjar, granddaughter of Ana de Mendoza, Princess of Eboli.

Despite being an adversary of Olivares, he received in 1640 a military command in the War against Portugal. He had the ambition to succeed Olivares as Valido and plotted against his successor Luis de Haro.

He prepared with Carlos de Padilla, a cavalry commander, a military coup to overthrow the King and to proclaim himself King of Aragon.
But Padilla was captured and tortured in the summer of 1648. Soon the Duke of Híjar was also imprisoned and tortured but he did not confess. Because of this, he was condemned to life imprisonment in the Castle of León, while Padilla and Domingo Cabral were executed.

Hijar died in prison, which seems harsh compared to the lenient sentence given to Gaspar Alfonso Pérez de Guzmán, 9th Duke of Medina Sidonia in 1641 for his part in the Andalusian independentist conspiracy (1641).

References 
 De Silva Fernández de Ixar Portugal: Partial Genealogy, Giorgio y Vittorio de Silva, Torino, Italia, Mayo 27 de 2005.

Silva Mendoza y Sarmiento Rodrigo de
Silva Mendoza y Sarmiento
Silva Mendoza y Sarmiento